Thomas James Mathias, FRS (c.1754 – August 1835) was a British satirist and scholar.

Life
Mathias was educated in Kingston upon Thames and Trinity College, Cambridge. He held some minor appointments in the royal household (sub-treasurer, 1782 and treasurer). He died in Naples, Italy.

Mathias became a vegetarian after reading Mandeville's The Fable of the Bees. He gave up all meat and lived on a diet of milk and vegetables.

Works
He was an accomplished Italian scholar, and translated various English works into Italian, such as Canzoni e prose toscane, and vice versa. He also produced a fine edition of the work of Thomas Gray, on which he lost heavily. His chief work was The Pursuits of Literature (1794), an undiscriminating satire on his literary contemporaries that went through 16 editions, but is now almost forgotten.  More so was his uncompromising criticism of the times.  An example:

Here is another little capriccio of a man of no common sagacity, the late Adam Smith.  He says seriously, by way of illustration; “No body ever saw a dog make a fair and deliberate exchange of one bone for another with another dog." Smith's Wealth of Nations, Vol. 1, p. 20. Ed. 8vo.  This philosophy is nearly of the same date as Adam's ancestor in Eden, and I can only say in reply, "Who ever expected to see a dog do so?"—We have all heard and read of that snarling sect the Cynics, and if we could convert dogs into philosophers, or what is harder still, philosophical propositions into meat and bones, (which I fear is more than most Scotch Professors can do) I should apply metaphorically the following lines from a celebrated Poet, a great observer of human nature:

“So when two dogs are fighting in the streets,
With a third dog one of the two dogs meets;
With angry tooth he bites him to the bone,
And this dog smarts for what that dog has done.”

Selected publications

The Pursuits of Literature (1798 edition)

References

1754 births
1835 deaths
Alumni of Trinity College, Cambridge
British satirists
Fellows of the Royal Society